The 46 Knox-class frigates were the largest, last, and most numerous of the US Navy's second-generation anti-submarine warfare (ASW) escorts. Originally laid down as ocean escorts (formerly called destroyer escorts), they were all redesignated as frigates on 30 June 1975, in the 1975 ship reclassification plan and their hull designation changed from 'DE' to 'FF'. The Knox class was the Navy's last destroyer-type design with a steam turbine powerplant.

Due to their unequal comparison to destroyers then in service (larger size with lower speed and only a single screw and 5-inch gun), they became known to a generation of destroyermen as "McNamara's Folly."

These ships were retired from the US Navy at the end of the Cold War due to their relatively high running costs, a declining defense budget, and the need for ships with a more advanced anti-submarine capability. None of the ships served more than 23 years in the US Navy, and by 1994, all of the class had been retired, although some remain in service with foreign nations such as Egypt, Taiwan, Thailand, and Mexico.

Design
Designated SCB No. 199C, the Knox was planned as the follow-on to the twin 5" gun-armed Garcia class frigates and the Tartar missile-equipped s. Their initial design incorporated the prior classes' pressure-fired boilers in a similar-sized hull designed around the massive bow-mounted AN/SQS-26 sonar, with increased endurance and reduced crew size. Anti-submarine armament was to consist of RUR-5 ASROC anti submarine missiles together with the QH-50 DASH drone helicopter, while defensive armament was to be the RIM-46 Sea Mauler short range anti-aircraft missile backed up by a single 5-inch/54 caliber Mark 42 gun.

The design soon ran into problems however, with the US Navy deciding to switch to conventional  boilers, requiring a redesign, and the ships became longer and heavier in order to accommodate the less compact power plants. Furthermore, Sea Mauler was cancelled in 1965, leaving the ships to complete without any anti-aircraft system except the 5" gun.

The ships were designed primarily as anti-submarine warfare (ASW) platforms. Their main anti-submarine sensor was the large bow-mounted AN/SQS-26CX low-frequency scanning sonar, operating as an active sonar at a frequency of about 3.5 kHz and passively at 1.5–4 kHz. An eight-round ASROC launcher (with 16 missiles carried) was fitted between the gun turret and the bridge, backed up by four fixed  Mark 32 anti-submarine torpedo tubes. A flight deck and hangar for operating the DASH drone helicopter was fitted aft.

Construction
Ten ships were authorized in Fiscal Year 1964, sixteen in 1965, and ten each for FYs 1966, 67 and 68; six were canceled in 1968, and four more in 1969. While the FY64 and FY65 ships were ordered from four different shipyards, later ships (DE-1078 onwards) were all ordered from Avondale Shipyards in order to cut costs. These ships were built on a production line, with prefabricated modules being assembled upside down, welded together and then rotated into an upright position. They were originally commissioned as destroyer escorts (DEs) 1052–1097 in 1969–1974, but were redesignated as frigates (FF) on 30 June 1975.

The lead ship of the class, was laid down 5 October 1965, and commissioned 12 April 1969, at the Todd Shipyards in Seattle, Washington.

Modifications
The  and subsequent ships of the class were modified to enable them to serve as flagships. The primary change was a slightly different arrangement of the "Officer's Country" staterooms with additional staterooms in a new 01 level structure which replaced the open deck between the boats. The stateroom on the port side under the bridge was designated as a "flag" stateroom, with additional staterooms for flag staff when serving as a flagship. These ships have been referred to as the Joseph Hewes-sub-class .

The modification heightened the bow section, adding bulwarks and spray strakes to prevent burrowing into on-coming seas and to better protect the forecastle armament.

Twenty-five ships of the class (DE-1052, 1056, 1063–1071 and 1078–1097) were refitted with the AN/SQS-35(V) Independent Variable Depth Sonar, an active sonar operating at about 13 kHz. The IVDS could take advantage of water layer temperature conditions in close-range (less than ) submarine detection, tracking and fire-control. The AN/SQS-35 "fish" was later modified to tow an AN/SQR-18A TACTASS passive towed array sonar. The DASH drone proved unreliable, and following its withdrawal in 1973, the ships' helicopter facilities were expanded to accommodate the larger, manned, Kaman Seasprite LAMPS 1 helicopter.

Thirty-one ships (DE-1052–1069 and 1071–1083) were fitted with an eight-round Basic Point Defence Missile System (BPDMS) launcher for RIM-7 Sea Sparrow missiles in place of the cancelled Sea Mauler short range surface to air missile system, while  was fitted with a NATO Sea Sparrow (IBPDMS) launcher. It was planned to equip the other 14 ships with Sea Chaparral, based on the Sidewinder air-to-air missile, but this plan was abandoned. Most ships were refitted with a  Phalanx CIWS aft during the 1980s, replacing the Sea Sparrow launcher.

In the 1970s, several ships received an interim surface warfare upgrade allowing Standard ARM anti-radar missiles to be fired from the ships' ASROC launcher. Later, all ships were modified to launch Harpoon anti-ship missiles from the ASROC launcher, which could carry two Harpoons, with two more carried in the ships' ASROC magazine.

Baleares class 
Five modified ships were built in Spain for the Spanish Navy as the Baleares-class. In these ships, the Sea Sparrow launcher and helicopter facilities were replaced by a Mk 22 launcher for sixteen Standard surface-to-air missiles, giving them a limited area air-defence capability.

Chi Yang class 

In the 1990s, the US agreed to transfer eight Knox-class frigates to the Republic of China Navy (ROCN). The ROCN, anticipating future difficulties in maintaining the steam plants on these ships, originally contemplated an ambitious plan to replace these plants with diesel engines. However, due to budget considerations and the acquisition of newer ships, this plan is now believed to have been shelved. These frigates were renamed the Chi Yang-class and assigned to the ROCN 168 Patrol Squadron.

By 2005, the ROCN had removed several systems from the retired  upgraded World War II-vintage destroyers and transferred them to seven of the Chi Yang class. These systems include SM-1MR Standard missile in box launchers, H-930 modular combat system, DA-08 air/surface search radar, and STIR-180 lighting radar. Each Chi Yang-class frigate has 10 SM-1 missiles installed in two forward twin box launchers on top of the helicopter hangar, and two triple box launchers installed between the stack and the hangar, pointing to port and starboard. Chi Yang (FFG-932) did not receive the upgrade.

The ASW capability of the Chi Yang class is provided by its SQS-26 bow-mounted sonar, SQS-35(v) VDS, SQR-18(v)1 passive TAS, MD500 ASW helicopter, Mk-16 8-cell Harpoon/RUR-5 ASROC box launcher, and four Mk46  torpedoes. While on ASW patrol, the frigate will carry two Harpoon SSMs and six ASROCs in its Mk-16 box launcher.

There are some speculations that these ships will probably be upgraded with Hsiung Feng III missiles.

Regarding to the outdated battle system onboard and the ageing ships, the class is expected to be replaced by the newly built Light Frigate.

Ships in Class

See also
 List of naval ship classes in service

References

Citations

References 

Blackman, Raymond V. B. (ed.) Jane's Fighting Ships 1971–72. London: Sampson Low, Marston & Co., Ltd., 1971. .
Friedman, Norman. The Naval Institute Guide to World Naval Weapon Systems 1997–1998. Annapolis, Maryland, USA: Naval Institute Press, 1997. .
Friedman, Norman. U.S. Destroyers: An Illustrated Design History. Annapolis, Maryland, USA: Naval Institute Press, 1982. .
Gardiner, Robert and Stephen Chumbley (eds.) Conway's All The World's Fighting Ships 1947–1995. Annapolis, Maryland, USA: Naval Institute Press, 1995. .
Moore, John. (ed.) Jane's Fighting Ships 1985–86. London: Jane's Yearbooks, 1985. .
Polmar, Norman. The Ships and Aircraft of the U.S. Fleet. Twelfth Edition. London: Arms and Armour Press, 1981. .
Prézelin, Bernard and A.D. Baker III (editors). The Naval Institute Guide to Combat Fleets of the World 1990/91:Their Ships, Aircraft and Armament. Annapolis, Maryland, USA: Naval Institute Press, 1990. .

External links 

Frigate classes
 
 Knox
 Knox